Blackshear Prison was a temporary prisoner of war camp located in Blackshear, Georgia, during the American Civil War.

During Union Maj. Gen. William T. Sherman's 1864 "March to the Sea," Confederate officials hastily made plans to evacuate a number of existing POW camps and relocate their occupants farther from the Federal army. As Blackshear is deep in southeast Georgia in a pine forest, it was thought to be a safe place for this relocation. The new prison was simply an open camp in a remote place, surrounded by a guardline, including some heavy artillery pieces. During the month of November in 1864, some 5,000 Union soldiers began arriving at Blackshear. The first shipment of 600 prisoners arrived by the Atlantic and Gulf Railroad on November 16 from Savannah. Within a few weeks, the population had swelled to nearly 5,000.

As Sherman approached the coastline, most of the prisoners were further evacuated to Charleston, South Carolina and other places. By December, the "corral" at Blackshear was empty of Union prisoners. Approximately 27 Union soldiers were buried in Blackshear until the close of the war, when they were reinterred at Beaufort National Cemetery, Beaufort, South Carolina. Their names are unknown.

See also
 American Civil War prison camps
 Pierce County Jail

References
 Blackshear overview

Defunct prisons in Georgia (U.S. state)
American Civil War prison camps
Georgia (U.S. state) in the American Civil War
1864 establishments in Georgia (U.S. state)
1864 disestablishments in Georgia (U.S. state)
Buildings and structures in Pierce County, Georgia